Ereğli (formerly Erekli) is a Turkish toponym derived from Ancient Greek Ἡράκλεια (Herakleia), in Latin Heraclea or Heraclia, named after the hero-born god Heracles. It may refer to :
 Karadeniz Ereğli, a city and its district in Zonguldak Province, Turkey
 Konya Ereğlisi, a city and its district in Konya Province, Turkey
 Marmara Ereğlisi, a city and its district in Tekirdağ Province, European Turkey, formerly archbishopric Heraclea in Europa, a Latin Catholic titular see
 Ereğli, a small town in Karamürsel district of Kocaeli Province in Turkey

Locally, they are all simply called "Ereğli".

Turkish toponyms